Chino Valley can refer to:

Chino Valley (Arizona), the valley location, (north) Chino Valley, Arizona
Chino Valley, Arizona
Little Chino Valley, a sub-valley on the northeast perimeter of Chino Valley, Arizona
Chino Valley, California (region)
Chino Valley Freeway